Felton LaFrance Spencer (January 5, 1968 – March 12, 2023) was an American professional basketball player who was a center for the Minnesota Timberwolves, Utah Jazz, Orlando Magic, Golden State Warriors, San Antonio Spurs, and New York Knicks of the National Basketball Association (NBA) from 1990 to 2002.

High school and college
Spencer was an all-state basketball player at Eastern High School in Middletown, Kentucky (now part of Louisville); as both a junior and a senior, he led the team to the KHSAA state tournament in Lexington.  In the first year, Eastern was upset by lightly regarded Metcalfe County in the first round, 60-58.  A year later as a senior, Eastern was eliminated in the quarter-finals by Hazard High School.

Spencer attended the University of Louisville, where he played college basketball for the Louisville Cardinals. He became the all-time field goal percentage leader at 62.8%.  He took over the center position as a senior in 1989–90 after Pervis Ellison left to join the NBA.  That season Spencer paced the Cardinals in scoring (14.9 ppg), rebounding (8.5 rpg), blocked shots (69), and field goal percentage (68.1%).

NBA career
The Minnesota Timberwolves selected Spencer in the first round, with the sixth overall pick, in the 1990 NBA draft. As a rookie, Spencer split time at center with  veteran Randy Breuer, but still managed respectable numbers, averaging 7.1 points and 7.9 rebounds per game, and shooting 51.2% from the floor. He finished the season with 272 offensive rebounds, the seventh-most in the NBA that year.  Additionally, he blocked 121 shots, establishing a single-season record for the young franchise that would stand until Kevin Garnett's rookie season in 1995-96.  For his efforts, Spencer was named to the NBA All-Rookie Second Team that year.  However, with the arrival of Luc Longley the following season, Spencer's playing time declined over the following two years.  After the 1992–93 season, Minnesota traded Spencer to the Utah Jazz for power forward/center Mike Brown.

In Utah, Spencer became the successor to Mark Eaton, and he provided the Jazz with solid scoring, rebounding and defense at the pivot position. In 1993–94, as a complement to John Stockton and Karl Malone, he averaged 8.6 points and 8.3 rebounds while shooting 50.5% from the floor.  Spencer and the Jazz seemed to be on their way to greatness in 1994–95, but 34 games into the season he ruptured his left Achilles tendon and was lost for the year.  Utah went on to win 60 regular-season games but failed to reach the NBA Finals by losing in the first round.  He missed the first 11 games of the 1995–96 season while recovering from his Achilles injury, but went on to play in the remaining 71, starting 70 and averaging 5.6 points and 4.3 rebounds in 17.8 minutes per game.  He shot a career-high 52.0% from the field, tying Adam Keefe for the second-best mark on the team.

On August 10, 1996, Spencer was obtained by the Orlando Magic for guard Brooks Thompson, forward Kenny Gattison and a first-round draft pick, after the Magic had lost Shaquille O'Neal to the Lakers as a free agent.  But he played just one game for Orlando before he was traded to Golden State in the deal that brought Rony Seikaly to the Magic.  He went on to play 71 games for the Warriors and do a solid job in the middle, ranking second on the team in rebounding and third in blocked shots.  His role was diminished in 1997–98 by the arrival of second-year man Erick Dampier as the starter, as well as the drafting of rookie Adonal Foyle, and he saw relatively limited action as a reserve in 68 games.  He played even less in 1998–99, averaging just 6.1 minutes in his 26 appearances off the bench.

Spencer retired after the 2001–02 season, last playing with the Knicks. He later worked as a security guard for Atherton High School in Louisville.

Coaching
In 2011, Spencer became an assistant basketball coach at Spalding University.

Spencer was later an assistant basketball coach at Bellarmine University in Louisville, KY.

Death
Spencer died at the University of Louisville Hospital on March 12, 2023, at the age of 55.

Career statistics

NBA
Source

Regular season

|-
| style="text-align:left;"| 
| style="text-align:left;"| Minnesota
| 81 || 46 || 25.9 || .512 || .000 || .722 || 7.9 || .3 || .6 || 1.5 || 7.1
|-
| style="text-align:left;"| 
| style="text-align:left;"| Minnesota
| 61 || 54 || 24.3 || .426 || – || .691 || 7.1 || .9 || .4 || 1.3 || 6.6
|-
| style="text-align:left;"| 
| style="text-align:left;"| Minnesota
| 71 || 48 || 18.3 || .465 || – || .654 || 4.6 || .2 || .3 || .9 || 4.1
|-
| style="text-align:left;"| 
| style="text-align:left;"| Utah
| 79 || 79 || 28.0 || .505 || – || .607 || 8.3 || .5 || .5 || .8 || 8.6
|-
| style="text-align:left;"| 
| style="text-align:left;"| Utah
| 34 || 34 || 26.6 || .488 || – || .793 || 7.6 || .5 || .4 || .9 || 9.3
|-
| style="text-align:left;"| 
| style="text-align:left;"| Utah
| 71 || 70 || 17.8 || .520 || – || .689 || 4.3 || .2 || .3 || .8 || 5.6
|-
| style="text-align:left;"| 
| style="text-align:left;"| Orlando
| 1 || 0 || 19.0 || 1.000 || – || – || 6.0 || 1.0 || .0 || .0 || 4.0
|-
| style="text-align:left;"| 
| style="text-align:left;"| Golden State
| 72 || 64 || 21.4 || .486 || – || .584 || 5.7 || .3 || .5 || .7 || 5.1
|-
| style="text-align:left;"| 
| style="text-align:left;"| Golden State
| 68 || 0 || 12.0 || .457 || – || .557 || 3.3 || .3 || .3 || .5 || 2.4
|-
| style="text-align:left;"| 
| style="text-align:left;"| Golden State
| 26 || 0 || 6.1 || .455 || – || .462 || 1.8 || .0 || .2 || .4 || 1.6
|-
| style="text-align:left;"| 
| style="text-align:left;"| San Antonio
| 26 || 0 || 5.7 || .455 || – || .667 || 1.5 || .1 || .2 || .3 || 1.9
|-
| style="text-align:left;"| 
| style="text-align:left;"| New York
| 18 || 0 || 6.3 || .600 || – || .600 || 1.9 || .1 || .1 || .1 || 2.2
|-
| style="text-align:left;"| 
| style="text-align:left;"| New York
| 32 || 8 || 7.8 || .231 || – || .515 || 1.6 || .1 || .2 || .3 || .9
|- class="sortbottom"
| style="text-align:center;" colspan="2"| Career
| 640 || 404 || 19.4 || .484 || .000 || .658 || 5.4 || .3 || .4 || .8 || 5.2

Playoffs

|-
| style="text-align:left;"| 1994
| style="text-align:left;"| Utah
| 16 || 16 || 30.8 || .448 || – || .660 || 8.4 || .4 || .2 || 1.3 || 7.9
|-
| style="text-align:left;"| 1996
| style="text-align:left;"| Utah
| 18 || 18 || 15.3 || .434 || .000 || .556 || 3.0 || .1 || .3 || 1.2 || 2.8
|-
| style="text-align:left;"| 2001
| style="text-align:left;"| New York
| 2 || 0 || 2.0 || – || – || – || .0 || .0 || .0 || .0 || .0
|- class="sortbottom"
| style="text-align:center;" colspan="2"| Career
| 36 || 34 || 21.4 || .443 || .000 || .644 || 5.3 || .3 || .2 || 1.2 || 4.9

References

External links

1968 births
2023 deaths
African-American basketball players
American men's basketball players
Basketball players from Louisville, Kentucky
Centers (basketball)
Golden State Warriors players
Louisville Cardinals men's basketball players
Minnesota Timberwolves draft picks
Minnesota Timberwolves players
New York Knicks players
Orlando Magic players
Parade High School All-Americans (boys' basketball)
San Antonio Spurs players
Utah Jazz players
Eastern High School (Louisville, Kentucky) alumni
21st-century African-American people
20th-century African-American sportspeople